The Asia Plaza Building is a 27-story,  skyscraper office building located in Zhongzheng District, Taipei, Taiwan. The building was designed by Taiwanese architect Chu-Yuan Lee. When the building was completed in 1990, it was the tallest in West Taipei, but was surpassed by Shin Kong Life Tower in 1993. The higher floors of the building house offices, hotels, a gym and a cram school, whilst the lower floors of the building house a department store.

See also 
 List of tallest buildings in Taiwan
 List of tallest buildings in Taipei
 Taipei Century Plaza

References

1990 establishments in Taiwan
Buildings and structures in Taipei
Skyscraper office buildings in Taipei
Office buildings completed in 1990
Shopping malls in Taipei